Tacuaras is a town in the Ñeembucú department of Paraguay. Tacuaras is a good fertile area for farming; it used to be lush green tropical forest, but now it has a population of about 300 people. The land in that territory is not very expensive, selling for about $100 per hectare.

Sources 
World Gazeteer: Paraguay – World-Gazetteer.com

Populated places in the Ñeembucú Department